The 1982 Hammersmith and Fulham Council election took place on 6 May 1982 to elect members of Hammersmith and Fulham London Borough Council in London, England. The whole council was up for election and the council stayed in no overall control.

Background

Both Labour and the Conservatives fielded a full slate of 50 candidates.

The SDP Liberal Alliance also ran a full 50 candidates - an increase from the 20 candidates they fielded in 1978.  On the ballot paper the candidates were listed alternatively as 'SDP-Liberal Alliance' and 'Liberal Alliance-SDP'.

The Ecology Party ran a single candidate in four wards - Brook Green, Coningham, Grove and Walham.

A single candidate in seven wards declared themselves to be representing the Residents' Association - Addison, Broadway, Coningham, Eel Brook, Gibbs Green, Margravine and Sands End.

Three candidates in Addison ward, two in Brook Green ward and one each in Grove and Margravine wards listed themselves as Independents.

Two candidates in Broadway ward and one in Sherbrooke ward used the 'Save London Action Group' banner.  This compared to 18 candidates in the 1978 election who listed themselves as part of the 'Save London Alliance'.  Across London at this election a further 46 candidates used the SLAG banner.

The Workers Revolutionary Party fielded two candidate - one each in Margravine and White City & Shepherds Bush wards. This was up from the single candidate at the previous election.  Across London the party fielded a further 13 candidates at this election.

The National Front fielded 2 candidates in the Wormholt ward - down from the 14 candidates they ran at the 1978 election in Hammersmith. Across London the National Front fielded a further 55 candidates at this election.

A total of 175 candidates put themselves forward for the 50 available seats - an increase from the 159 candidates who contested the previous election.

Election result
The Labour Party won 25 seats (a gain of one seat), the Conservative Party 23 seats (a loss of one seat), and the SDP Liberal Alliance two seats (unchanged from the Liberal Party result in 1978).  No party had overall control.

The Conservatives maintained control of the Council with the support of the two Liberal Alliance councillors - Kim Howe was elected Council Leader.

Ward results

Addison

Avonmore

Broadway

Brook Green

Colehill

College Park & Old Oak

Coningham

Crabtree

Eel Brook

Gibbs Green

Grove

Margravine

Normand

Palace

Ravenscourt

Sands End

Sherbrooke

Starch Green

Sulivan

Town

Walham

White City & Shepherds Bush

Wormholt

References

1982
1982 London Borough council elections
May 1982 events in the United Kingdom
20th century in the London Borough of Hammersmith and Fulham